VBH may refer to:

 Vicki Butler-Henderson, a British motorsport driver and television presenter
 Virginal breast hypertrophy, a medical condition causing excessive growth of the breasts during puberty.
 VBH Luxury, Italian Luxury Accessories House